Lilla Jönssonligan på styva linan is the second film in the Swedish Lilla Jönssonligan film series. It was released on November 28, 1997, in Sweden and was directed by Christjan Wegner.

The film has been shown several times on the Swedish television channels SVT1, TV3 and TV4. It was released in Germany on September 14, 2000, as Die Jönnson Bande: Charles Ingvars neuer Plan.

Plot
It's in the middle of the summer. Sickan, Ragnar and Dynamit- Harry, or the Jönsson League as they call themselves, has nothing to do until the circus comes to town. Sickan quickly thinks out a plan on how they're going to get tickets. However, after they've got their hands on the tickets, the three friends arch enemy, Junior Wall- Enberg, son of the city's mayor Vigor Wall- Enberg, steals the tickets.

The Jönsson League goes to Junior's house during night to get the tickets back, but they're not the only ones  sneaking around the mayor's house. Three members of the circus, the human cannonball, the sword swallower, and the clown, are actually criminals and are at the house to steal the families paintings. The police arrives to the house after an alarm is triggered, and they find The Jönsson League hiding, while the circus members escape with the paintings. The Jönsson League becomes the main suspect of the stolen paintings, so they dress up as girls and go to the circus to get the paintings back.

Cast
Kalle Eriksson - Charles-Ingvar "Sickan" Jönsson 
Jonathan Flumée - Ragnar Vanheden
Fredrik Glimskär - Dynamit-Harry
Jonna Sohlmér - Doris
Robert Gustafsson - Cannonball
Johan Rabaeus - Clown
Ulla Skoog - Sword swallower 
Niklas Falk - Sigvard Jönsson
Cecilia Nilsson - Tora Jönsson
Isak Ekblom - Sven-Ingvar Jönsson 
Loa Falkman - Oscar Wall-Enberg 
Lena T. Hansson - Lilian Wall-Enberg 
Micke Dubois - Loket
Peter Harryson - Amusement park director

References

External links

Swedish children's films
Jönssonligan films
Swedish comedy films
Films set in the 1950s
1990s Swedish-language films
1990s Swedish films